"Heaven and Hell" is a 1967 song and single by Australian rock group The Easybeats, which was written by band members George Young and Harry Vanda. The song marked a changed in style for the group, influenced by the psychedelic and baroque pop of the time.

Controversy and releases
When the song was released worldwide in June 1967, it ran into censorship problems in some regions.  In the U.K. it was banned by the BBC because of references to "discovering someone else in your bed". In the U.S., United Artists feared record stations would also object to the line "discovering someone else in your bed".  To play it safe, a censored version was recorded with a replacement line "discovering that your love has gone dead". The song appeared in Australia, briefly, in censored form but was soon released uncensored.

The song performed disappointingly in the U.S and U.K.  It charted in the U.S. on the Cashbox and Record World charts at #92 and #96 retrospectively. In the U.K. it reached #55 on Record Retailer's charts. In their home country of Australia it did much better, reaching #14 in Go-Set.

Track listing
Australia - Parlophone A-8224, U.K. - United Artists UP 1183, U.S. - United Artists UA 50187
"Heaven And Hell" ( Harry Vanda, George Young) – 2:35
"Pretty Girl " (Harry Vanda, George Young) – 2:28

Charts

References

1967 singles
The Easybeats songs
Number-one singles in Australia
Parlophone singles
Songs written by George Young (rock musician)
1967 songs
Songs banned by the BBC